Liceo Neandro Schilling is a Chilean high school located in San Fernando, Colchagua Province, Chile. It was established in 1846.

References

External links
 

Secondary schools in Chile
Schools in Colchagua Province
National Monuments of Chile
Educational institutions established in 1846
1846 establishments in Chile